Fuyug (Fuyuge, Fuyughe, Mafulu) is a language of Papua New Guinea spoken in the Central Province of the country. The language's 14,000 speakers live in 300 villages in the Goilala District.

Phonology

Vowels
Fuyug possesses five vowel phonemes.

The vowel  is pronounced as the diphthong  when word-final as well as before a word-final consonant.

All vowels are nasalised before a nasal consonant, as in in ("pandanus") , ung ("nose") , em ("house") .

Consonants
Fuyug has 14 consonant phonemes.

The voiceless plosive are aspirated in a word-final position and before : endanti ("outside") , oki ("fire") , eyak ("return") .

The nasal phoneme  assimilates before a velar consonant becoming  : yangos ("rain") .

The pronunciation of the liquid  is in free variation between a lateral  and a flap . However, with the exception of words of foreign origin where the word in the source language is written with an r, this is represented in the orthography as l.

Syllables
Fuyug syllables come in the shape (C)V(C)(C). There cannot be more than two consonants adjacent to one another word-internally and the only final clusters permitted are mb, nd and ng. Within a word vowels may not follow one another.

Stress
Stress in Fuyug is predictable. Stress falls on the final syllable in mono- and disyllabic words and on the antepenult in words of three of four syllables. Affixes do not alter the stressed syllable.

Morphophonology
Certain suffixes (notably the illative -ti) cause a change in the end of the word to which it is attached:
 m assimilates to n before t: im + -ti → inti ("in the eye")
 l is elided before t:  + -ti →  ("in the heart")
 Voiced plosives are devoiced at the end of a word when the following word begins with a vowel or a voiceless consonant:  +  →  ("a road"),  +  →  ("a lot of sand").
 an i is inserted between two consonant if the first is not l or a nasal: ev + -ti → eviti ("in the Sun"). With certain verbal suffixes an e is inserted: id + -ngo → idengo ("is sleeping").
 When a root with a final vowel has suffix or clitic attached to it that begins with a vowel, the first vowel is deleted: ne + -a → na ("he eats").

Grammar

Personal pronouns
Fuyug has personal pronouns for three numbers (singular, dual, plural) but not gender distinction.

These pronouns can take four different suffixes: the genitive -l or -le, the emphatic -ni, the comitative -noy and the contrastive -v.

Numerals
The numbers 3, 4 and 5 are composed of 1 and 2:
 3:  ("two its other")
 4:  ("two and two") ;
 5:  ("two and two and its other").

After five English numerals are used (numbers less than five often do so as well). The quantifier  ("a lot") is also used after three.

References

Bibliography
 Bradshaw, Robert L. (2007). Fuyug Grammar Sketch (No. 53). SIL-PNG Academic Publications.

Languages of Central Province (Papua New Guinea)
Goilalan languages